Stanisław Bohdan Grabiński (1891–1930) was a Polish nobleman (szlachcic) and landowner.

Stanisław was owner of Walewice estates. He was married to Maria Dzieduszycka on 9 January 1918 in Lwów, and to Countess Jadwiga Maria Potocka on 19 November 1921 in Kraków. His son Władysław Krzysztof fought and died in the Warsaw Uprising in 1944.

Stanisław also had four other children, including Maria Dominika Grabińska, Stanisław Wojciech Grabinski, Róża Cecylia Grabińska and Jan Kanty Grabiński.

1891 births
1930 deaths
20th-century Polish nobility